The 1976 Nigerian coup d'état attempt was a military coup attempt which took place in Nigeria on 13 February 1976 when a faction of Armed Forces officers, led by Lieutenant Colonel Bukar Suwa Dimka, attempted to overthrow the government of General Murtala Mohammed (who himself took power in the 1975 coup d'état). 

Mohammed was assassinated in Lagos, along with his aide-de-camp Lieutenant Akintunde Akinsehinwa, when his car was ambushed in Ikoyi en route to the Dodan Barracks, by a group of soldiers led by Dimka. In a planned broadcast to the nation, Dimka had cited corruption, indecision, arrest and detention without trial, weakness on the part of Mohammed and maladministration in general as the reasons for overthrowing the government. The coup attempt was crushed several hours later by government troops.

After a three-week manhunt, Dimka was arrested near Abakaliki in southeastern Nigeria on 6 March 1976. Following a court martial, Dimka and another 6 co-conspirators were executed by firing squad on 15 May 1976.

General Mohammed was succeeded by Lieutenant General Olusegun Obasanjo as head of state.

References

History of Nigeria
Military coups in Nigeria
1976 in Nigeria
February 1976 events in Africa
1970s coups d'état and coup attempts
Conflicts in 1976
Attempted coups d'état in Nigeria